Julius Ubido (born 29 December 1984) is a Nigerian footballer who plays for Warri Wolves, as a midfielder.

Career
Ubido has played club football in Nigeria for Heartland.

He made one international appearance for Nigeria in 2011.

References

External links

1984 births
Living people
Association football midfielders
Nigerian footballers
Nigeria international footballers
Heartland F.C. players
Warri Wolves F.C. players